Army Men is a real-time tactics video game developed and published by The 3DO Company for Microsoft Windows and Game Boy Color.

Plot

At the beginning of this game Sarge is tasked with a simple recon mission on the front line - locate some documents - that takes place in 3 regions: Desert, Alpine and Bayou. At the end of this game, Sarge finds a strange portal that leads to the next dimension - the Real World - and the next game. Regarded as a classic by fans, this is one of the few games to actually display Sarge and his squad as merely pawns in a bigger battle. Two features that make this game almost unique in the series are its storytelling (Black-White spoofs of old-time, World War II-style newsreels) and the fact that it often depicts a frontline or other fighting that doesn't involve the main characters.

Development
Army Men was originally in development for the  Panasonic M2, but that version was never released due to the system's cancellation. The game was showcased at E3 1997.

Reception

Next Generation reviewed the PC version of the game, rating it three stars out of five, and stated that "it's a solid, fun example of the genre, and anyone looking for a new strategy game with a very nice graphic twist should seriously consider this".

Aggregating review website GameRankings gave the Game Boy Color version 74.67% based on 6 reviews and the Microsoft Windows version 60.91% based on 17 reviews.

References

External links

1998 video games
Army Men
Cancelled Panasonic M2 games
Game Boy Color games
Real-time strategy video games
Single-player video games
Video games developed in the United States
Windows games